Setesdalsheiene is the collective term for the mountains to the west and east of the Setesdalen valley in Agder county in Southern Norway.  The river Otra flows through the valley between the mountains.  This area is primarily located in the municipalities of Bykle, Valle, Bygland, Evje og Hornnes, Sirdal, Kvinesdal, and Åseral.  The vast Hardangervidda plateau lies to the north and the Ryfylkeheiene mountains lie to the west.

The landscape is mostly rugged with moorland and exposed bedrock with many lakes surrounded by alpine flora. There are wild reindeer herds living in Setesdalsheiene.

References

Setesdal
Mountain ranges of Norway
Bykle
Vinje
Landforms of Agder